Rajkumar Mahadeo (born 19 August 1970) is a Trinidadian cricketer. He played in one List A and three first-class matches for Trinidad and Tobago in 1991/92.

See also
 List of Trinidadian representative cricketers

References

External links
 

1970 births
Living people
Trinidad and Tobago cricketers